A powdered egg is a fully dehydrated egg. Most powdered eggs are made using spray drying in the same way that powdered milk is made. The major advantages of powdered eggs over fresh eggs are the reduced weight per volume of whole egg equivalent and the shelf life. Other advantages include smaller usage of storage space, and lack of need for refrigeration. Powdered eggs can be used without rehydration when baking, and can be rehydrated to make dishes such as scrambled eggs and omelettes.

History 

Dehydrated eggs advertisements appeared in the late 1890s in the United States. Powdered eggs appear in literature as a staple of camp cooking at least as early as 1912.

Powdered eggs were used in the United Kingdom during World War II for rationing. Powdered eggs are also known as dried eggs, and colloquially during the period of rationing in the UK, as Ersatz eggs.

The modern method of manufacturing powdered eggs was developed in the 1930s by Albert Grant and Co. of the Mile End Road, London. The cake manufacturer was importing liquid egg from China and one of his staff realised that this was 75% water. An experimental freeze-drying plant was built and tried. Then a factory was set up in Singapore to process Chinese egg. As war approached, Grant transferred his dried egg facility to Argentina. The British Government lifted the patent during the war and many other suppliers came into the market, notably in the United States. Early importers to the United States included Vic Henningsen Sr. and others in the United Kingdom.

Quality 
Powdered eggs have a storage life of 5 to 10 years when stored without oxygen in a cool storage environment.

The process of spray-drying eggs so as to make powdered eggs oxidizes the cholesterol, which has been shown to be helpful at reducing aortic atherosclerosis in animal trials.

See also

 Food powder
 List of dried foods

References

Dried foods
Eggs (food)
Instant foods and drinks
Eggs